Anna Šišková (born 30 June 1960) is a Slovak actress. She won the Czech Lion award for Best Actress in 2000 for her role in the Academy Award-nominated film Divided We Fall. Her daughters, Dorota Nvotová, and Tereza Nvotová are also actresses.

References

External links

1960 births
Living people
Slovak film actresses
People from Žilina
20th-century Slovak actresses
21st-century Slovak actresses
Czechoslovak actresses
Czech Lion Awards winners